Jonathan Taylor Shave (born November 4, 1967 in Waycross, Georgia) is a former Major League infielder who played for the Texas Rangers and the Minnesota Twins.

Shave attended Mississippi State University. In 1989 he played collegiate summer baseball with the Falmouth Commodores of the Cape Cod Baseball League and was named a league all-star. He was selected by Texas in the 5th round of the 1990 MLB Draft.

References

External links

1967 births
Living people
Gastonia Rangers players
Charlotte Rangers players
Tulsa Drillers players
Oklahoma City 89ers players
Salt Lake Buzz players
Oklahoma RedHawks players
Pawtucket Red Sox players
Major League Baseball shortstops
Baseball players from Georgia (U.S. state)
Texas Rangers players
Minnesota Twins players
Mississippi State Bulldogs baseball players
Falmouth Commodores players